

Boxing

2020 Summer Olympics (Boxing)
 February 20 – 29: Olympic Qualifying Tournament – Africa in  Dakar
 March 3 – 11: Olympic Qualifying Tournament – Asia & Oceania in  Amman 
 March 13 – 23: Olympic Qualifying Tournament – Europe in  London
 March 26 – April 3: Olympic Qualifying Tournament – Americas in  Buenos Aires
 May 13 – 24: World Olympic Qualifying Tournament in  Paris

International boxing events
 October 10 – 15: 2020 World University Boxing Championships in  Katowice

Fencing

2020 Summer Olympics (Fencing)

2020 Summer Paralympics (Wheelchair fencing)

International fencing events
 February 22 – 29: 2020 Pan American Junior Fencing Championships in  San Salvador
 February 22 – March 3: 2020 European Junior Fencing Championships in  Poreč
 February 25 – March 5: 2020 Asian Junior Fencing Championships in  Jakarta
 April 3 – 11: 2020 World Junior & Cadet Fencing Championships in  Salt Lake City
 April 17 – 22: 2020 Asian Fencing Championships in  Seoul
 April 19 – 24: 2020 African Fencing Championships in  Cairo
 June 16 – 21: 2020 Pan American Fencing Championships in  Asunción
 June 16 – 21: 2020 European Fencing Championships in  Minsk

2019–20 Fencing Grand Prix
 Épée Grand Prix
 January 24 – 26: Qatari Grand Prix in  Doha
 March 6 – 8: Hungarian Grand Prix in  Budapest
 May 1 – 3: Colombian Grand Prix (final) in  Cali
 Foil Grand Prix
 February 7 – 9: Italian Grand Prix in  Turin
 March 13 – 15: American Grand Prix in  Anaheim
 May 15 – 17: Chinese Grand Prix (final) in  Shanghai
 Sabre Grand Prix
 January 10 – 12: Canadian Grand Prix in  Montreal
 April 26 – 28: Korean Grand Prix in  Seoul
 May 24 – 26: Russian Grand Prix (final) in  Moscow

2019–20 Fencing World Cup
 Men's Épée World Cup
 November 22 – 24, 2019: Swiss World Cup in  Bern
 Winner:  Ihor Reizlin
 Team winners: 
 January 9 – 11: German Men's Épée World Cup in  Heidenheim an der Brenz
 February 7 – 9: Canadian World Cup in  Vancouver
 March 20 – 22: Argentinian World Cup in  Buenos Aires
 May 15 – 17: French Men's Épée World Cup (final) in  Paris
 Women's Épée World Cup
 November 1 – 3, 2019: Estonian World Cup in  Tallinn
 Winner:  Ana Maria Popescu
 Team winners: 
 January 10 – 12: Cuban World Cup in  Havana
 February 7 – 9: Spanish Women's Épée World Cup in  Barcelona
 March 20 – 22: Chinese World Cup in  Chengdu
 May 15 – 17: Emirati World Cup (final) in  Dubai
 Men's Foil World Cup
 November 8 – 10, 2019: German Men's Foil World Cup in  Bonn
 Winner:  Julien Mertine
 Team winners: 
 December 13 – 15, 2019: Japanese World Cup (Olympic Test Event) in  Tokyo
 Winner:  Alessio Foconi
 Team winners: 
 January 10 – 12: French Men's Foil World Cup in  Paris
 February 21 – 23: Egyptian Men's Foil World Cup in  Cairo
 May 1 – 3: Russian World Cup (final) in  Saint Petersburg
 Women's Foil World Cup
 November 22 – 24, 2019: Egyptian Women's Foil World Cup in  Cairo
 Winner:  Arianna Errigo
 Team winners: 
 December 13 – 15, 2019: French Women's Foil World Cup in  Saint-Maur-des-Fossés
 Winner:  Alice Volpi
 Team winners: 
 January 10 – 12: Polish Women's Foil World Cup in  Katowice
 February 21 – 23: (TBA)
 May 1 – 3: German Women's Foil World Cup (final) in  Tauberbischofsheim
 Men's Sabre World Cup
 November 15 – 17, 2019: Egyptian Men's Sabre World Cup in  Cairo
 Winner:  Vincent Anstett
 Team winners: 
 February 21 – 23: Polish Men's Sabre World Cup in  Warsaw
 March 6 – 8: Italian World Cup in  Padua
 March 20 – 22: Hungarian World Cup in  Budapest
 May 8 – 10: Spanish Men's Sabre World Cup (final) in  Madrid
 Women's Sabre World Cup
 November 22 – 24, 2019: French Women's Sabre World Cup in  Orléans
 Winner:  Manon Brunet
 Team winners: 
 December 13 – 15, 2019: American World Cup in  Salt Lake City
 Winner:  Olha Kharlan
 Team winners: 
 March 6 – 8: Greek World Cup in  Athens
 March 20 – 22: Belgian World Cup in  Sint-Niklaas
 May 8 – 10: Tunisian World Cup (final) in  Tunis

Judo

2020 Summer Olympics (Judo)

2020 Summer Paralympics (Judo)

2020 World and continental judo events
 April 16 – 19: 2020 African Judo Championships in  Casablanca
 April 17 – 19: 2020 Asian-Pacific Judo Championships (Senior & Team) in  Ulaanbaatar
 April 17 – 19: 2020 Pan American Judo Championships in  Montreal
 May 1 – 3: 2020 European Judo Championships in  Prague
 June 6 & 7: 2020 European Kata Championships in  Warsaw-Józefów
 September 1 & 2: 2020 World Kata Championships in  Kraków
 October 31 & November 1: 2020 European Mixed Team Judo Championships (location TBA)

2020 Judo Grand Slam
 February 8 & 9: JGS #1 in  Paris
 February 21 – 23: JGS #2 in  Düsseldorf
 March 13 – 15: JGS #3 in  Yekaterinburg
 May 8 – 10: JGS #4 in  Baku
 October 11 – 13: JGS #5 in  Brasília
 October 22 – 24: JGS #6 in  Abu Dhabi
 December 11 – 13: JGS #7 (final) in  Tokyo

2020 Judo Grand Prix
 January 23 – 25: JUGP #1 in  Tel Aviv
 March 6 – 8: JUGP #2 in  Rabat
 March 27 – 29: JUGP #3 in  Tbilisi
 April 3 – 5: JUGP #4 in  Antalya
 June 12 – 14: JUGP #5 in  Budapest
 June 26 – 28: JUGP #6 in  Hohhot
 September 18 – 20: JUGP #7 in  Zagreb
 October 2 – 4: JUGP #8 (final) in  Tashkent

2020 Asian Open
 July 4 & 5: AsJO #1 in  Aktau
 August 29 & 30: AsJO #2 in  Taipei
 September 5 & 6: AsJO #3 (final) in  Kowloon

2020 European Open
 February 1 & 2: EJO #1 in  Sofia (Men) &  Odivelas (Women)
 February 15 & 16: EJO #2 in  Oberwart (Men) &  Bratislava (Women)
 February 29 & March 1: EJO #3 in  Warsaw
 September 26 & 27: EJO #4 in  Rome
 October 10 & 11: EJO #5 in  Tallinn
 October 17 & 18: EJO #6 (final) in  Málaga

2020 European Cup
 March 7 & 8: EJC #1 in  Zürich
 March 21 & 22: EJC #2 in  Sarajevo
 May 16 & 17: EJC #3 in  Orenburg
 June 20 & 21: EJC #4 in  Celje-Podčetrtek
 June 27 & 28: EJC #5 in  Potsdam
 September 12 & 13: EJC #6 in  Bratislava
 October 3 & 4: EJC #7 (final) in  Dubrovnik

2020 Pan American Open
 March 7 & 8: PAJO #1 in  Bariloche
 March 14 & 15: PAJO #2 in  Santiago
 March 21 & 22: PAJO #3 in  Lima
 June 20 & 21: PAJO #4 in  Guayaquil
 September 5 & 6: PAJO #5 (final) in  Santo Domingo

2020 African Open
 November 7 & 8: AJO #1 in  Yaoundé
 November 14 & 15: AJO #2 (final) in  Dakar

Karate

2020 Summer Olympics (Karate)

International karate events
 February 7 – 9: 2020 EKF Junior, Cadet, & U21 Karate Championships in  Budapest
 February 7 – 9: 2020 UFAK Junior & Senior Karate Championships in  Tangier
 March 25 – 29: 2020 European Karate Championships in  Baku
 April 3 – 5: 2020 Mediterranean Karate Championships in  Nicosia
 May 25 – 30: 2020 PKF Karate Championships in  San José
 June 29 – July 2: 2020 WKF Youth Camp in  Poreč
 July 10 – 12: 2020 AKF Junior, Cadet, & U21 Karate Championships in  Kuwait City
 August 24 – 29: 2020 PKF Junior, Cadet, & U21 Karate Championships in  Monterrey
 September 4 – 6: 2020 Asian Karate Championships in  Bali
 November 5 – 8: 2020 World University Karate Championships in  Brasília
 November 17 – 22: 2020 World Karate Championships in  Dubai

2020 Karate 1 – Premier League
 January 24 – 26: K1PL #1 in  Paris
 February 14 – 16: K1PL #2 in  Dubai
 February 28 – March 1: K1PL #3 in  Salzburg
 March 13 – 15: K1PL #4 in  Rabat
 April 17 – 19: K1PL #5 in  Madrid
 October 2 – 4: K1PL #6 (final) in  Moscow

2020 Karate 1 – Series A
 January 10 – 12: K1SA #1 in  Santiago
 June 19 – 21: K1SA #2 in  Istanbul
 September 11 – 13: K1SA #3 (final) in  Durban

2020 Karate 1 – Youth League
 May 1 – 3: K1YL #1 in  Limassol
 July 3 – 5: K1YL #2 in  Poreč
 September 25 – 27: K1YL #3 in  Monterrey
 December 4 – 6: K1YL #4 (final) in  Venice

Mixed Martial Arts

UFC
The UFC promotional company held a total of 41 events in 2020, with 5 being cancelled altogether. 11 of these events were pay-per-view events for championships which held 19 title fights. Due to the coronavirus pandemic, it held the record of the lowest in person attendance since the inception of the UFC.

Bellator
In 2020 Bellator held a total of 18 events out of their planned 24, due to 6 events being cancelled.

Taekwondo

2020 Summer Olympics (Taekwondo)
 February 22 & 23: African Olympic Qualifier for Tokyo 2020 in  Rabat
 February 29: Oceania Olympic Qualifier for Tokyo 2020 in  Gold Coast
 March 11 & 12: Pan American Olympic Qualifier for Tokyo 2020 in  San José
 April 10 & 11: Asian Olympic Qualifier for Tokyo 2020 in  Wuxi
 April 24 & 25: European Olympic Qualifier for Tokyo 2020 in  Milan

2020 Summer Paralympics (Taekwondo)

International Taekwondo championships
 February 7 – 9: 2020 El Hassan Cup in  Amman
 February 18 – 21: 2020 President's Cup - European Region in  Helsingborg
 October 14 – 18: 2020 World Junior Taekwondo Championships in  Sofia

2020 Open tournaments
 January 31 – February 2: Fujairah Open in the 
 February 3 – 5: Turkish Open in  Istanbul
 February 6 – 8: Mexico Open in  Puerto Vallarta
 February 22 & 23: Helsingborg Open in 
 February 22 & 23: Slovenia Open in  Ljubljana
 February 29 & March 1: German Open in  Hamburg

Wrestling

2020 Wrestling Continental Championships
 2020 Individual Wrestling World Cup in  Belgrade ⇒ 12–18 December
 2020 European Wrestling Championships in  Rome ⇒ 10–16 February
 2020 Asian Wrestling Championships in  New Delhi ⇒ 18–23 February
 2020 Pan American Wrestling Championships in  Ottawa ⇒ 6–9 March
 2020 African Wrestling Championships in  Algiers ⇒ 8–9 February
 2020 Pan American Wrestling Olympic Qualification Tournament in  Ottawa ⇒ 13–15 March

2020 Wrestling International Tournament
 2020 Yasar Dogu Tournament in  Istanbul ⇒ 10–12 January
 Golden Grand Prix Ivan Yarygin 2020 in  Krasnoyarsk ⇒ 23–26 January
 2020 Grand Prix Zagreb Open in  Zagreb  ⇒ 7–8 November
 2020 Wladyslaw Pytlasinski Cup in  Warsaw ⇒ 7–8 November

Wushu

Notes

References

External links
 International Boxing Association (Amateur)
 FIE - Fédération Internationale d'Escrime (International Fencing Federation)
 International Judo Federation
 World Karate Federation
 World Association of Kickboxing Organizations
 International Mixed Martial Arts Federation
 International Federation of Muaythai Amateur
 International Sambo Federation
 International Sumo Federation
 World Taekwondo Federation
 United World Wrestling
 International Wushu Federation

Combat sports
combat
2020 sport-related lists